"Save Me" is a single by British DJ Darren Styles, the third single released from his album Skydivin', it was released in 2006. The single reached #70 on the UK Singles Chart.

Track listing

CD Single / Download
Original Hardcore Edit (3:54)
Nitelite Edit (3:51)
Original Hardcore Mix (7:40)
Extended Club Mix (7:44)
CJ Stone Remix (6:49)
Hypasonic Remix (6:57)

CD Promo
Extended Mix (7:46)
CJ Stone Remix (6:49)
Original Hardcore Version (7:45)
Flip & Fill Mix (6:22)
Friday Night Posse Mix (7:25)
Kenny Hayes Remix (7:34)
Technikal Remix (7:55)
Hypasonic Remix (6:58)
Kenny Hayes Nitelite Mix (5:16)

12" Promo
Alex K Remix (7:37)
Hypasonic Remix (6:58)

Music video
The music video for "Save Me" was filmed in Spain, using high wires to show Darren jumping off a tall building.
There are two versions of the video, one for the Hardcore mix and another for the Nitelite edit.
In the Hardcore Mix Darren jumps from a building whilst dreaming of a blonde girl named Dawn McGovern from Saltdean, near Brighton in East Sussex.
At the end of the Nitelite video he is saved by the girl. The song contains the famous chorus "'Cause I want you to save me, just please save me, save me."

Personnel
Written By, Producer, Vocals - Darren Styles
Backing Vocals - Mike Di Scala
Guitar - Francis Hill
Additional Producer, Remix (Track 2 CDS) - Kenny Hayes at the AATW Studios, UK
Record Label - AATW
Publisher - Paul Rodriguez Music Ltd
Marketing - Absolute Marketing and Distribution
Distribution - Universal

Charts

References

2006 songs
2007 singles
Darren Styles songs
Songs written by Darren Styles